HMY Victoria and Albert, a  steamer launched on 16 January 1855, was a royal yacht of the sovereign of the United Kingdom until 1900, owned and operated by the Royal Navy. She displaced 2,390 tons, and could make  on her paddles. There were 240 crew.

Career
Queen Victoria made her first cruise in her on 12 July 1855. On 3 June 1859, Victoria and Albert ran aground in the Scheldt whilst on a voyage from Gravesend, Kent to Antwerp, Belgium.

Queen Victoria left the ship to Empress Elisabeth of Austria for her cruise to Madeira in 1860. 

The ship was used by Prince Arthur on the occasion of his visit to Heligoland in 1872.

Queen Victoria sent the ship to Vlissingen to ferry Crown Prince Friedrich Wilhelm of Germany accompanied by his wife Victoria, their three youngest daughters, Professor Gerhardt, two court officials and two ladies-in-waiting across the Channel to be treated of his throat illness in England by Dr. Mackenzie. They alighted in Sheerness on 15 June 1887.

 was built to the same specifications for Isma'il Pasha, the Khedive of Egypt in 1865 and survives today, although heavily altered.

Notable commanding officers
 John Fullerton, appointed 1884
 John Denison, appointed 1893

Notes

References

External links
 

Victoria and Albert 2
Steam yachts
Maritime incidents in June 1859